Becoming Abi is a 2021 Nigerian sitcom series created by Bolu Essien and inspired by the true life events of Bolu Essien in the Nigerian advertising industry. The six-part drama sitcom series was released to Netflix on 28 October 2022 and it stars Nollywood actors and actresses like Idowu Philips, Bolu Essien, Biodun Stephen, Stan Nze, Akah Nnani, Seun Ajayi, Juliana Olayode and others.

Synopsis 
The sitcom series features the story of  Abi (played by Bolu Essien) who secures a job at a top advertising agency in Lagos, although she had a rough start with her superior, she soon got an opportunity to shine at work when she was promoted to become the acting manager after the manager travelled to another branch. The series features love, betrayal, office politicking, career goals and many more issues faced in the workplace, and how Abi was also able to scale through even when she was promoted to a permanent head role ahead of those she met at the office.

Selected cast 

 Bolu Essien as Abiodun (Abi)
 Idowu Philips as Big Mummy
 Juliana Olayode as Joyce
 Stan Nze as Mike
 Seun Ajayi as Isreal
 Ifeanyi Kalu as MD
 Biodun Stephen as Shade
 Akah Nnani as Daniel
 Benita Okojie Adeyina as Bimbo
 April Oshidipe as Shai

Episodes

Release 
The six-part series inspired by true life events was released to Netflix on 28 October 2022 and the series has been supported by companies in Nigeria including Gala, Supa Komando, Glover and Essenza.

References

External links 

English-language Netflix original programming
Nigerian drama television series
Television shows set in Lagos